Marshall Avener (born December 10, 1950) is an American gymnast. He competed at the 1972 Summer Olympics and the 1976 Summer Olympics.

References

External links
 

1950 births
Living people
American male artistic gymnasts
Olympic gymnasts of the United States
Gymnasts at the 1972 Summer Olympics
Gymnasts at the 1976 Summer Olympics
Sportspeople from Brooklyn
Pan American Games medalists in gymnastics
Pan American Games gold medalists for the United States
Pan American Games bronze medalists for the United States
Gymnasts at the 1975 Pan American Games
Medalists at the 1975 Pan American Games
Penn State Nittany Lions men's gymnasts
20th-century American people
21st-century American people